The Gumption is the second full-length album from Canadian R&B artist Tanika Charles, released on May 10, 2019 through Record Kicks. It was long-listed for the 2019 Polaris Music Prize and nominated for the 2020 Juno Awards R&B/Soul Recording of the Year.

The album was supported by the singles "Love Overdue", "Tell Me Something", and "Look At Us Now", each of which were accompanied by video directed by V.T. Nayani. The album was announced with an animated teaser video for the song "Cadillac Moon" created by Aline Helmcke on March 11, 2019.

Copies of the album are available on CD and LP, as well as across all streaming and digital download music services. The single "Love Overdue" was made available on limited edition 7" vinyl.

Release and reception

The Gumption received critical acclaim upon release.

Track listing

Notes
 Mixed by Michael Warren. Mastered by Bryan Lowe at João Carvalho Mastering.

Personnel
Credits complied from the liner notes of The Gumption and Tanika Charles' website.

 Alex Gamble - engineer
 Ben Foran - guitar
 Bryan Lowe - mastering
 Chin Injeti - producer, multiple instruments
 Clayton Connell - keys
 Daniel Lee - songwriter, producer, engineer, multiple instruments
 David Longenecker - upright bass
 Dennis Paterson - engineer
 DJ Kemo - producer, engineer, multiple instruments
 Eoin McManus - keys
 Hunter Pearson - producer, multiple instruments
 Jennifer Balance - makeup
 Jeremy Morgan - drums
 Kevin Henkel - producer, engineer, multiple instruments
 Lenny Solomon - string arrangements, violin
 Marlon James - songwriter, producer, engineer, multiple instruments
 Michael Warren - songwriter, engineer, management
 Miku Graham - additional vocals
 Nick Papadakis - viola
 Robert Bolton - songwriter
 Sean "D/SHON" Henderson - songwriter, additional vocals
 Taha Muharuma - photography, design
 Tanika Charles - songwriter, vocals
 Wendy Solomon - cello

References 

2019 albums
Tanika Charles albums